Lower Branch is a community in the Canadian province of Nova Scotia, located in the Lunenburg Municipal District.

Parks
Cookville Provincial Park

References
 Lower Branch on Destination Nova Scotia

Communities in Lunenburg County, Nova Scotia
General Service Areas in Nova Scotia